Sobolevo is a rural locality (a village) in Yaganovskoye Rural Settlement, Cherepovetsky District, Vologda Oblast, Russia. The population was 27 as of 2002.

Geography 
Sobolevo is located 33 km northeast of Cherepovets (the district's administrative centre) by road. Beketovo is the nearest rural locality.

References 

Rural localities in Cherepovetsky District